The 2009 election for New York City Comptroller was held on November 3, 2009, to coincide with the 2009 mayoral election to determine who would serve as New York City Comptroller. The Democratic and Republican primaries were held on September 15, 2009. There was a run-off election for the Democratic Party nomination on September 29, 2009.

Joe Mendola was nominated as the Republican candidate. John Liu was nominated as the candidate of the Democratic Party; he was also on the Working Families Party line in November. Liu won the race and was elected Comptroller, becoming the first Asian American to be elected to a citywide office.

Democratic nomination
Four candidates sought the Democratic Party nomination.

They were:
Melinda Katz, City Council member and former State Assemblywoman
John Liu, City Council member
David Weprin, City Council member and former Deputy Superintendent of the New York State Banking Commission
David Yassky, City Council member

In March 2009, Liu announced that he was running for the post of New York City Comptroller. As part of this bid, Liu donated $10,000 to the Working Families Party; they endorsed him less than 6 months later. Liu raised $3 million for his political run, more than his competitors.

Beginning in May, Liu picked up several endorsements. The Village Independent Democrats, The Queens County Democratic organization, the local Americans for Democratic Action chapter and the Working Families Party, 1199 SEIU union local and the Uniformed Firefighters Association endorsed him. On September 1, the United Federation of Teachers endorsed Liu.

Primary election
In the September 15 Democratic primary, Liu was the front-runner, ending up with 133,986 votes, or 38 percent of the vote.

Run-off election
Because he did not manage to reach 40 percent of the vote, a run-off election was required between Liu and runner-up Yassky, who received 30 percent of the vote in the primary. The Daily News wrote that Yassky and Liu slung mud in a spirited debate on September 24, 2009. On September 29, Liu won the run-off by taking 55.6% of the vote against Yassky.

Republican nomination
One candidate sought the Republican Party nomination.

Joe Mendola

Polling

Election returns

Democratic primary election

First round, Tuesday, September 15, 2009

Most (about 65) of the 108 write-in votes were for Salim Ejaz, over 40 of which were cast in Brooklyn.

Democratic primary run-off election

As no candidate had received 40% of the Democratic vote for this office in the September 15 primary, a run-off election between the two most-popular candidates was held on Tuesday, September 29, 2009.

General election

John Liu won the general election held on Tuesday, November 3, 2009.

Source: Board of Elections in the City of New York

See also

New York City Comptroller
Government of New York City
New York City mayoral election, 2009
New York City Public Advocate election, 2009

References

New York City Comptroller
Comptroller Election
Comptroller 2009